Ilaria Latini (born October 21, 1972) is an Italian voice actress.

Biography 
Latini is the second-born daughter of voice actor Franco Latini and dialogue writer Maria Pinto. She is also the sister of voice actress Laura Latini and the half-sister of voice actor Fabrizio Vidale. Latini began her voice acting career at the age of four with the help from her father. To this day, Latini serves as the official Italian voice dubber of Katie Holmes, Amy Adams and Anna Faris. Some of her popular dubbing roles include Joey Potter in Dawson's Creek and Alice Cullen in The Twilight Saga.

In Latini's animated roles, she has been the primary Italian voice of Flora in the popular animated series Winx Club, Tweety from Looney Tunes since the 1980s and Ike Broflovski in South Park. She has also dubbed characters from animated productions such as Zootopia, Animaniacs, Total Drama and Shrek the Third.

Personal life 
Latini is married to Spanish voice actor Diego Suarez. Together, they have three children: Riccardo, Emanuele and Sofia.

Dubbing roles

Animation 
 Flora and Amore in Winx Club
 Flora in Winx Club: The Secret of the Lost Kingdom
 Flora in Winx Club 3D: Magical Adventure
 Uniqua in The Backyardigans
 Tweety in Looney Tunes
 Ming-Ming in Wonder Pets
 Ike Broflovski in South Park
 Judy Hopps in Zootopia
 Dot Warner in Animaniacs
 Brittany Miller in The Chipmunk Adventure
 Kari Kamiya in Digimon Adventure
 Ali in The Land Before Time IV: Journey Through the Mists
 Lil DeVille in Rugrats
 LaCienega Boulevardez in The Proud Family
 Numbuh 3 in Codename: Kids Next Door
 Minako Aino/Sailor Venus in Sailor Moon
 Cinderella in Shrek the Third
 Lester Goldberg in Stanley
 Katara in Avatar: The Last Airbender
 Starfire in Teen Titans
 Starfire in Teen Titans Go!
 Bridgette in Total Drama
 Wonder Woman in Wonder Woman
 Brandy Harrington in Brandy & Mr. Whiskers
 Ophelia Ramirez in The Life and Times of Juniper Lee
 Joyce Kinney in Family Guy
 Jillian in Despicable Me 2
 Ingrid Third in Fillmore!
 Po in Teletubbies
 Sticks the Badger in Sonic Boom
 Emily Elizabeth in Clifford the Big Red Dog
 Malina in The Emperor's New School
 Carmen in Happy Feet Two
 Kate in Alpha and Omega
 Quinn Airgon/Nightfall in Final Space
 Trina in ChalkZone
 Gia in Madagascar 3: Europe's Most Wanted (Latin Spanish dub)

Live action 
 Alice Cullen in Twilight
 Alice Cullen in The Twilight Saga: New Moon
 Alice Cullen in The Twilight Saga: Eclipse
 Alice Cullen in The Twilight Saga: Breaking Dawn – Part 1
 Alice Cullen in The Twilight Saga: Breaking Dawn – Part 2
 Cindy Campbell in Scary Movie
 Cindy Campbell in Scary Movie 2
 Cindy Campbell in Scary Movie 3
 Cindy Campbell in Scary Movie 4
 Lois Lane in Man of Steel
 Lois Lane in Batman v Superman: Dawn of Justice
 Lois Lane in Justice League
 Heather Holloway in Thank You for Smoking
 Erin Sadelstein in Jack and Jill
 Bobbie Jo Chapman in Logan
 Joey Potter in Dawson's Creek
 Emma Pillsbury in Glee
 Grace Winslow in The Smurfs
 Grace Winslow in The Smurfs 2
 Grace Van Pelt in The Mentalist
 Giselle in Enchanted
 Mary in The Muppets
 April in The Hot Chick
 Zoey in The Dictator
 Hannah Lewis in My Super Ex-Girlfriend
 Wendy Franklin in Take Me Home Tonight
 Christy Plunkett in Mom
 Taylor Townsend in The O.C.
 Peggy Carter in Agent Carter
 Evelyn Robin in Christopher Robin
 Olive in Goodbye Christopher Robin
 Casey in 27 Dresses
 Connie Baker in Mona Lisa Smile
 Becca Crane in Vampires Suck
 Betty Draper in Mad Men
 Melissa Chartres in The Last Man on Earth
 Jade in The Hangover Part III
 Thea Queen / Speedy in Arrowverse
 Jo Wilson and Brooke Stadler in Grey's Anatomy
 Chantal Anne Harper in Nicky, Ricky, Dicky & Dawn
 Caroline Channing in 2 Broke Girls
 Amanda Tanen in Ugly Betty
 Janis Hawk in FlashForward
 Gloria Mendoza in Orange Is the New Black
 Malcolm in Malcolm in the Middle
 Carla Espinosa in Scrubs
 Topanga Matthews in Girl Meets World
 Anya Jenkins in Buffy the Vampire Slayer
 Ella Lopez in Lucifer
 Melissa Peyser in The In-Laws
 Rachel Jansen in Forgetting Sarah Marshall
 Kate Libby / Acid Burn in Hackers
 Liz Parker in Roswell
 Mystique in Epic Movie
 Stacie Blake in Sleepover
 Stacey in The Visit
 Emily Newton in Beethoven's 2nd
 Haley Robinson in Big Mommas: Like Father, Like Son
 Chloe Sullivan in Smallville

References

External links 

1972 births
Living people
Actresses from Rome
Italian voice actresses
20th-century Italian actresses
21st-century Italian actresses